The 1984 European Parliament election in Greece was the election of the delegation from Greece to the European Parliament in 1984. This was the second European election and the first time Greece voted with the rest of the Community.

Results

Elected MEPs
List of members of the European Parliament for Greece, 1984–1989

References

Greece
European Parliament elections in Greece
1980s in Greek politics
European